The alpine skiing competition of the Vancouver 2010 Paralympics will be held at Whistler, British Columbia. The events were due to be held between 13 March, and 21 March 2010. Events scheduled for 13 March, however, were postponed due to weather conditions – specifically, low visibility.

In the Women's sitting giant slalom, Alana Nichols of the United States – a Paralympic champion in basketball from Beijing in 2008 – won her first of two skiing gold medals, becoming a rare winter-summer gold medalist. On 18 March, Viviane Forest became the first Canadian athlete to win a gold in both the Winter and Summer Paralympics, by winning the Women's Downhill for Visually Impaired. She had previously won gold in the 2000 and 2004 Summer Paralympics for women's goalball.

Lauren Woolstencroft sets the gold medal record with 5 gold medals, for most gold medals won by any Winter Paralympian at a single Games.

Medal table

Events
The competition events are:

Downhill: women – men
Super-G: women – men
Giant slalom: women – men
Slalom: women – men
Super combined: women – men

Each event has separate men's and women's competitions and separate standing, sitting, and visually impaired classifications. Visually impaired skiers compete with the help of a sighted guide. The skier with the visual impairment and the guide are considered a team, and dual medals are awarded.

Women's events

Men's events

Competition schedule
All times are Pacific Standard Time (UTC-8).

See also
Alpine skiing at the 2010 Winter Olympics

References 

Alpine Skiing – Sports – Vancouver 2010 
Alpine Skiing Schedule 

 
2010 Winter Paralympics
2010 Winter Paralympics events
Paralympics